Roderick E. Liddle (born 1 April 1960) is an English journalist, and an associate editor of The Spectator. He was an editor of BBC Radio 4's Today programme. His published works include Too Beautiful for You (2003), Love Will Destroy Everything (2007), The Best of Liddle Britain (co-author, 2007) and the semi-autobiographical Selfish Whining Monkeys (2014). He has presented television programmes, including The New Fundamentalists, The Trouble with Atheism, and Immigration Is A Time Bomb.

Liddle began his career at the South Wales Echo, then worked for the Labour Party, and later joined the BBC. He became editor of Today in 1998, resigning in 2002 after his employers objected to one of his articles in The Guardian. He currently writes for The Sunday Times, The Spectator and The Sun, among other publications.

Early life and radio
Liddle was born in Sidcup, Kent, the son of a train driver. From the age of eight, he was brought up in Nunthorpe, a suburb of Middlesbrough, in north east England. He was educated at the comprehensive Laurence Jackson School in nearby Guisborough and the adjacent Prior Pursglove College, where he formed a punk band called Dangerbird. At 16, he was a member of the Socialist Workers Party, remaining a member for about a year, and was a supporter of the Campaign for Nuclear Disarmament (CND) around the same time.

He attended the London School of Economics (LSE) as a mature student, where he read Social Psychology. His early career in journalism was with the South Wales Echo in Cardiff where he was a general news reporter and, for a time, the rock and pop writer. He worked between 1983 and 1987 as a speechwriter and researcher for the Labour Party.

Although Liddle considered becoming a teacher, he decided against it on the grounds that he "could not remotely conceive of not trying to shag the kids". Liddle also courted controversy discussing the public and police's response to child pornography and highlighted the Pete Townshend case as a means to highlight problems with enforcing the law. Liddle instead returned to journalism after graduating from the LSE, and was taken on as a trainee producer by the BBC. Liddle was appointed editor of the Today programme in 1998. The programme had a strong reputation for its political interviews, but Liddle tried, with some success, to improve the programme's investigative journalism. To this end he hired journalists from outside the BBC. Among the most controversial was Andrew Gilligan, who joined from The Sunday Telegraph in 1999. Gilligan's 29 May 2003 report on Today—that the British government had "sexed up" the intelligence dossier on Iraq, a report broadcast after Liddle had left the programme—began a chain of events that included the death in July that year of David Kelly, the weapons inspector who was Gilligan's source, and the subsequent Hutton Inquiry, a public inquiry into the circumstances of Kelly's death. Liddle defended Gilligan throughout the controversy.

Under Liddle's editorship, Today won a number of awards: a Sony Silver in 2002 for reports by Barnie Choudhury and Mike Thomson into the causes of race riots in the north of England; a Sony Bronze in 2003 for an investigation by Angus Stickler into paedophile priests; and an Amnesty International Media Award in 2003 for Gilligan's investigation into the sale of illegal landmines, an investigation that attracted a lengthy legal action. While working for Today, Liddle also wrote a column for The Guardian. On 25 September 2002, referring to a march organised by the Countryside Alliance in defence of fox hunting, Liddle wrote that readers may have forgotten why they voted Labour in 1997, but would remember once they saw the people campaigning to save hunting. His column led The Daily Telegraph to accuse Liddle of bias and of endangering democracy.

The BBC concluded that Liddle's comments breached his commitment to impartiality as a BBC programme editor, and gave him an ultimatum to stop writing his column or resign from his position on Today. He resigned on 30 September 2002. He said later that when he was editor he was ordered by BBC management to sack Frederick Forsyth from the show, and speculated that it was because of Forsyth's rightwing political views. The BBC replied that the decision was made for editorial reasons.

Television

The New Fundamentalists
In The New Fundamentalists, a programme in the Dispatches strand broadcast in March 2006, Liddle, a member of the Church of England, condemned the rise of evangelicalism and Christian fundamentalism in Britain, especially the anti-Darwinian influence of such beliefs in faith schools; and criticised the social teaching and cultural influence of this strand of Christianity. The documentary was criticised by David Hilborn of the Evangelical Alliance, and by Rupert Kaye of the Association of Christian Teachers.

The Trouble with Atheism
In The Trouble with Atheism, Liddle argued that atheists can be as dogmatic and intolerant as the adherents of religion. Liddle said, "History has shown us that it's not religion that's the problem, but any system of thought that insists that one group of people are inviolably in the right, whereas the others are in the wrong and must somehow be punished." Liddle argued, for example, that eugenic policies are the logical consequence of dogmatic adherence to Darwinism.

Immigration Is a Time Bomb
Liddle's Immigration Is a Time Bomb was broadcast by Channel 4 in 2005. The complaints that followed it included that he should not have allowed British National Party leader Nick Griffin to speak unchallenged. Ofcom adjudicated that the programme was fair, and the complaints were dismissed. Liddle subsequently argued, after Griffin was acquitted in February 2006 of two charges of inciting racial hatred, that the charges were "too ephemeral, too dependent upon the mindset and political disposition of the juror, and upon what is happening outside of the courtroom, on the streets."

Other work
In April 2007, Liddle presented a two-hour-long theological documentary called The Bible Revolution where he looked back in history to William Tyndale's translation of the Bible in English and the effect this had upon the English language. On 21 May 2007, he presented an hour-long documentary, Battle for the Holy Land: Love Thy Neighbour, about the Israeli-Palestinian Conflict. He visited Bethlehem, Hebron and the Israeli settlement of Tekoa. Liddle sought to examine whether Israel was a true liberal democracy in light of its treatment of the Palestinians. He also appeared in Channel 4's alternative election night episode of Come Dine with Me along with Edwina Currie, Derek Hatton and Brian Paddick.

With Kate Silverton, he presented the short-lived BBC2 political show Weekend—described by The Independent on Sunday as "The worst programme anywhere, ever, in the history of time", and BBC Four's The Talk Show. He continued to write for The Guardian, and became a team captain on Call My Bluff. He became an associate editor with The Spectator. He also writes for the men's magazines, GQ and Arena, and a weekly column for The Sunday Times.

Later print journalism

Allegations of misogyny and racism
In August 2009, in his Spectator blog he wrote about Harriet Harman, deputy leader of the Labour Party, in unflattering terms. Liddle began the article by asking: "So — Harriet Harman, then. Would you? I mean after a few beers obviously, not while you were sober." Tanya Gold asserted in The Guardian that Liddle had delivered a "tissue-thin polemic." Pointing out that it was The Spectators cover story that week, Gold wondered if, after 100 years of striving to improve women's rights, whether "we're back in the schoolyard – or is it the brothel?" Rachel Cooke in The Observer nearly two months later recalled finding Liddle's piece "so disgusting I flushed violently all the way from my breastbone to my forehead when I first read it. I looked like I had German measles." Cooke went on to say: "I would still like to do something really unpleasant to the man who wrote [the article]."

Liddle asserted two months later that the Harman column "was supposed to be a parody of guttural, base sexism", a joke he assumed readers would understand. After the negative response from Gold (and then Cooke, among other female journalists) he continued: "And then I suppose I came to the conclusion – gradually – that I must have got it wrong." In June 2014, he said that of those he had offended, Harman was the one person to whom he would apologise.

In November 2009, again for The Spectator website, he offered "a quick update on what the Muslim savages are up to," a brief article about the stoning to death of a 20-year-old woman in Somalia after she was accused of adultery, and the similar death of a 13-year-old the year before. He made remarks, considered sarcastic, that read: "Incidentally, many Somalis have come to Britain as immigrants recently, where they are widely admired for their strong work ethic, respect for the law and keen, piercing, intelligence."

In December 2009, on his Spectator blog, Liddle referred to two black music producers, Brandon Jolie and Kingsley Ogundele, who had plotted to kill Jolie's 15-year-old pregnant girlfriend, as "human filth" and said the incident was not an anomaly. He continued:
The overwhelming majority of street crime, knife crime, gun crime, robbery and crimes of sexual violence in London is carried out by young men from the African-Caribbean community. Of course, in return, we have rap music, goat curry and a far more vibrant and diverse understanding of cultures which were once alien to us. For which, many thanks.
When he was accused of racism, Liddle said he was instead engaging in a debate about multiculturalism. In March 2010 the Press Complaints Commission (PCC) upheld a complaint against Liddle, who became the first journalist to be censured over the contents of a blog, because he had not been able to prove his claim about the crime statistics. After the publication of London crime figures in June 2010, The Sunday Telegraph suggested Liddle was largely right on some of his claims, but that he was probably wrong on his claims about knife crimes and violent sex crimes.

In October 2010, Liddle called for the abolition of the Welsh language TV channel S4C as a result of the 2010 Comprehensive Spending Review. In his article for The Spectator, he described Welsh nationalists as "miserable, seaweed munching, sheep-bothering pinch-faced hill-tribes".

In August 2018, Liddle wrote an article in The Spectator in support of Foreign Secretary Boris Johnson's controversial comments regarding burkas. The article included the subheading, 'My own view is that there is not nearly enough Islamophobia within the Tory party'.

Giving a speech at Durham University in December 2021, Liddle claimed that "It is fairly easily proven that colonialism is not remotely the major cause of Africa’s problems, just as it is very easy to prove that the educational underachievement of British people of Caribbean descent or African Americans is nothing to do with institutional or structural racism".

Independent editor rumour and Millwall supporters website
The Guardian reported on 8 January 2010 that the expected purchase of The Independent by Alexander Lebedev, a Russian billionaire, would be followed by the appointment of Liddle as editor. Roy Greenslade wrote on 11 January that the reports were provoking a "major internal and external revolt" by The Independent'''s staff and readers. The stories about Liddle's posts on Millwall Online apparently further reduced the likelihood of his being offered the job. Finally, on 19 February, Stephen Brook of The Guardian reported that Liddle was no longer in the running for the post. Tim Luckhurst, Professor of Journalism at the University of Kent, argued that Liddle's prospects of editing The Independent were nullified "by the people behind a viciously intolerant campaign of liberal bigotry".

In January 2010, the press drew attention to allegedly racist and misogynist comments posted under the username "monkeymfc"—a name Liddle has used—on Millwall Online, a fan club web forum with no official connection to Millwall Football Club. Liddle at first attributed some of the comments to opposition fans logging in under his name to embarrass him. He later admitted he had written some of the posts that were being criticised, including one in support of the BNP excluding Black and Asian people from the party. Another post, in which he joked about not being able to smoke at Auschwitz, led to his being asked to explain what he meant in The Jewish Chronicle. While he said in June 2014 that his comments were taken out of context, he does not regret making them. "No. Never. Absolutely not. I thought about my mates at Millwall Online, God I respect them so much more than these other people, these ghastly fucking people."

Stephen Lawrence, Lee Rigby, disabled and transgender people
In November 2011, an article by Liddle for The Spectator suggested the trial of two men accused (and later convicted) of murdering Stephen Lawrence would not be fair. It was referred to the Attorney General (Dominic Grieve) by the judge for possible contempt of court, and he ordered the jurors not to read it. Having decided that it might have breached a court order, Grieve passed the case on to the Crown Prosecution Service and the Director of Public Prosecutions. The decision that The Spectator was to be prosecuted by the CPS for breaching reporting restrictions was announced on 9 May 2012, with a court hearing scheduled for 7 June, although Liddle as the author was not himself liable for prosecution. Fraser Nelson, the magazine's editor, announced that the prosecution would not be contested, and the magazine pleaded guilty at the hearing. The fine was £3,000, plus £2,000 compensation to Stephen Lawrence's parents and £625 costs.

In January 2012, Liddle wrote that many people in the UK were "pretending to be disabled" in his column for The Sun, an opinion defended by James Delingpole who thought "Rod's point is well made". Frances Ryan in The Guardian accused him of "belittling something that on a daily basis affects real people" who can be "a huge benefit to society. Maybe for a month Liddle would like to try that."

On 23 May 2013, Liddle wrote about the murder of soldier Lee Rigby near the Royal Artillery Barracks in Woolwich, London. In the original version of a blog article for The Spectator, he referred to the perpetrators as "two black savages". After many objections to his language use,  this phrase was modified. Liddle apologised.William Turvill "Spectator's Rod Liddle apologises for describing Woolwich attackers as 'black savages'", Press Gazette, 28 May 2013

In May 2015, the Independent Press Standards Organisation (IPSO) upheld a complaint from Trans Media Watch that Liddle had been discriminatory towards Emily Brothers, a blind and transgender Labour candidate at the 2015 general election, in two Sun columns published in December 2014 and January 2015. In commenting in the way he had Liddle had breached two sections of the editors' code.

BBC coverage of the death of Nelson Mandela
In December 2013 in a blog article for The Spectator website published shortly after Nelson Mandela died, Liddle wrote that the BBC coverage on his death was excessive. Richard Garside, director of the Centre for Crime and Justice Studies, tweeted a "Rod Liddle decision tree" which described Liddle as a "wind-up merchant".Tomas Javinda "Rod Liddle criticised for describing death of Nelson Mandela as ‘famous nice black man dies’", The Independent, 6 December 2013

Column on poppers and gay sex
During a parliamentary debate on the Psychoactive Substances Bill – which "makes it an offence to produce, supply, offer to supply, possess with intent to supply, possess on custodial premises, import or export psychoactive substances" the Conservative politician Crispin Blunt admitted he used poppers:

And would be directly affected by this legislation. And I was astonished to find that it's proposed they be banned and, frankly, so were very many gay men.

Liddle responded in his Spectator blog: So, Crispin Blunt MP feels hurt because laws proscribing  (or 'poppers') would criminalise the entire gay community. ... I would have thought that the requirement for amyl nitrate to relax the sphincter muscle and lube to accommodate entry was God's way of telling you that what you're about to do is unnatural and perverse. Or your body's way of telling you – your call. So eeeeuw. ... Crispin and others can always use a jemmy [crowbar] instead.

The satirical and current affairs magazine Private Eye described this as hypocritical, pointing out Liddle's account in The Sunday Times of using Viagra in July 2004 in which he wrote that it was: "The weirdest drug I ever took, far more psychologically disturbing than LSD. For the next six hours, I had this implacable, disembodied, unconscionably rigid appendage dragging me hither and thither". 

A spokesperson from the LGBT rights charity Stonewall said of Liddle's remarks: "Comments like this are shocking and damaging, but we wouldn't expect anything less from repeat offending bigots like Rod Liddle. The Government's move for an immediate review of whether poppers are harmful is right, but banning them ... will cause confusion and drive gay and bi men who use poppers to seek out illegal drug suppliers from April onwards, putting their health at serious risk."

Unfair treatment by Newsnight
Liddle appeared on the BBC's Newsnight to discuss Brexit on 15 July 2019, debating anti-Brexit activist Tom Baldwin. A complainant alleged that BBC host Emily Maitlis had been "sneering and bullying" towards Liddle, accusing him of writing columns of containing "consistent casual racism week after week" and asking Liddle if he would describe himself as a racist. An investigation by the BBC Executive Complaints Unit upheld the complaints against Maitlis, agreeing that she had been "persistent and personal" in her criticism of Liddle thus "leaving her open to the charge that she had failed to be even-handed" in the discussion. The successful complainant suggested that the broadcast exemplified the way the BBC views Leave voters; Douglas Murray described the segment as "more of a drive-by shooting than an interview".

Column on Muslim voters
In October 2019, Liddle penned a column in The Spectator commenting on the forthcoming December 2019 UK general election, which suggested that the election should be held on a Muslim holy day to reduce the Labour vote.
The column was criticised by senior political figures including Chancellor of the Exchequer Sajid Javid and former Conservative Deputy Prime Minister David Lidington.  Liddle defended the content as being humorous.  The article  also criticised the Labour MP Rosie Duffield's recent speech about her experience of trying to exit an abusive relationship; Duffield described the article as "racist and misogynistic".

Books
In 2003, Liddle wrote a collection of short stories, Too Beautiful For You. He said he has always wanted to be a writer, and saw journalism as a cop-out. He is also the author of Love Will Destroy Everything (2007) and the co-author of The Best of Liddle Britain (2007).Selfish Whining Monkeys: How we Ended Up Greedy, Narcissistic and Unhappy, appeared in 2014. Admitting to having paid little attention to Liddle's journalism, Will Self, in his review for The Guardian wrote: "it's so much more authoritative to hear a man condemned out of his own mouth over 200-plus pages than it is to assay him on the basis of newspaper columns, which, by and large, favour polarised views tendentiously expressed." Despite his serious reservations about Liddle's writing, Self concludes: "The peculiar thing is that I can't find it in my heart of hearts to dislike the man, I think there's good in him and that he can change his bilious complexion." Liddle responded to Self's review in an interview with Archie Bland of The Independent a few weeks later: "He reviewed what he thought I was, not what the book was about. Bizarre. I think it's slightly deranged."

In July 2019 Liddle published The Great Betrayal, a book about Brexit. The book was reviewed positively by Professor Matthew Goodwin in The Sunday Times, who called it "a no-holds-barred attack on the Establishment's blocking of Brexit". Harry Mount at The Spectator called the book "very engaging", despite noting concerns that the book's claim of a betrayal of Brexit possibly proving to be unfounded. However, Fintan O'Toole writing for The Guardian said the book was "as untroubled by facts as by logic".

Personal life
Liddle met Rachel Royce, a television presenter, at the BBC in 1993, and the couple soon became romantically involved.  In January 2004 the couple married at a ceremony in Malaysia. They had been living in Heytesbury, Wiltshire, and had two sons together, Tyler and Wilder. Six months later, Liddle moved in with Alicia Monckton, a 22-year-old receptionist at The Spectator. It transpired that he had cut short his honeymoon with Royce so that he could be with Monckton. Following their divorce, Liddle and Royce exchanged attacks in the media. Liddle called her a "total slut and slattern", and Royce wrote an article in the Daily Mail titled "My cheating husband Rod, 10 bags of manure and me the bunny boiler. As for The Slapper... she's welcome to him".

On 5 May 2005, he was arrested for common assault against Monckton, who was 20 weeks pregnant at the time. He admitted the offence and accepted a police caution, but asserted later that he did so only because it was the quickest way for him to be released, and that he had not assaulted her. The couple's daughter, Emmeline, named after the suffragette, Emmeline Pankhurst, was born in October 2005. The couple married in September 2008.

Bibliography

Books

References

External links
 
 Spectator blog
 Profile at The Guardian
 Articles written by Rod Liddle at The Spectator''
 The Spectator article

Living people
1960 births
English Anglicans
English columnists
English male journalists
Alumni of the London School of Economics
Anglo-Scots
BBC newsreaders and journalists
Critics of atheism
Labour Party (UK) people
Socialist Workers Party (UK) members
The Guardian people
The Sunday Times people
The Sun (United Kingdom) people
The Spectator people
Anglican writers
British critics of Islam
Critics of multiculturalism
People from Sidcup